The Mixtecs, or Mixtecos, are indigenous Mesoamerican peoples of Mexico inhabiting the region known as La Mixteca of Oaxaca and Puebla as well as La Montaña Region and Costa Chica Regions of the state of Guerrero. The Mixtec Culture was the main Mixtec civilization, which lasted from around 1500 BC until being conquered by the Spanish in 1523.

The Mixtec region is generally divided into three subregions based on geography: the Mixteca Alta (Upper Mixtec or Ñuu Savi Sukun), the Mixteca Baja (Lower Mixtec or Ñuu I'ni), and the Mixteca Costa (Coastal Mixtec or Ñuu Andivi). The Alta is drier with higher elevations, while the Baja is lower in elevation, hot but dry, and the Coasta also low in elevation but much more humid and tropical. The Alta has seen the most study by archaeologists, with evidence for human settlement going back to the Archaic and Early Formative periods. The first urbanized sites emerged here. Long considered to be part of the larger Mixteca region, groups living in the Baja were probably more culturally related to neighboring peoples in Eastern Guerrero than they were to the Mixtecs of the Alta. They even had their own hieroglyphic writing system called ñuiñe. The Costa only came under control of the Mixtecs during the military campaigns of the Mixtec cultural hero Eight Deer Jaguar Claw. Originally from Tilantongo in the Alta, Eight Deer and his armies conquered several major and minor kingdoms on their way to the coast, establishing the capital of Tututepec in the Lower Río Verde valley. Previously, the Costa had been primarily occupied by the Chatinos.

In pre-Columbian times, a number of Mixtec kingdoms competed and allied with each other and with Zapotec kingdoms in the Central Valleys. Like the rest of the indigenous peoples of Mexico, the Mixtec were conquered by the Spanish invaders and their indigenous allies in the 16th century. Pre-Columbian Mixtecs numbered around 1.5 million. Today there are approximately 800,000 Mixtec people in Mexico, and there are also large populations in the United States. The Mixtec languages form a major branch of the Oto-Manguean language family.

Nomenclature and etymology
The term Mixtec (Mixteco in Spanish) comes from the Nahuatl word mixtecah , "cloud people". There are many names that the Mixtecs have for naming themselves: ñuù savi, nayívi savi, ñuù davi, nayivi davi. etc. All these denominations can be translated as 'the land of the rain'. The historic homeland of Mixtec people is La Mixteca, called in Mixtec language Ñuu Savi, Ñuu Djau, Ñuu Davi, etc., depending on the local variant. They call their language sa'an davi, da'an davi or tu'un savi.

Overview

In pre-Columbian times, the Mixtec were one of the major civilizations of Mesoamerica.  Important ancient centers of the Mixtec include the ancient capital of Tilantongo, as well as the sites of Achiutla, Cuilapan, Huajuapan, Mitla, Tlaxiaco, Tututepec, Juxtlahuaca, and Yucuñudahui.  The Mixtec also made major constructions at the ancient city of Monte Albán (which had originated as a Zapotec city before the Mixtec gained control of it). The work of Mixtec artisans who produced work in stone, wood, and metal was well regarded throughout ancient Mesoamerica.

According to West, "the Mixtec of Oaxaca...were the foremost goldsmiths of Mesoamerica," which included the "lost-wax casting of gold and its alloys."

At the height of the Aztec Empire, many Mixtecs paid tribute to the Aztecs, but not all Mixtec towns became vassals. They put up resistance to Spanish rule until they were subdued by the Spanish and their central Mexican allies led by Pedro de Alvarado.

Mixtecs have migrated to various parts of both Mexico and the United States. In recent years a large exodus of indigenous peoples from Oaxaca, such as the Zapotec and Triqui, has seen them emerge as one of the most numerous groups of Amerindians in the United States.  As of 2011, an estimated 150,000 Mixteco people were living in California, and 25,000 to 30,000 in New York City. Large Mixtec communities exist in the border cities of Tijuana, Baja California, San Diego, California and Tucson, Arizona. Mixtec communities are generally described as trans-national or trans-border because of their ability to maintain and reaffirm social ties between their native homelands and diasporic community.  (See: Mixtec transnational migration.)

Mixtecs in the colonial era

There is considerable documentation in the Mixtec (Ñudzahui) native language for the colonial era, which has been studied as part of the New Philology.  Mixtec documentation indicates parallels between many indigenous social and political structures with those in the Nahua areas, but published research on the Mixtecs does not primarily focus on economic matters. There is considerable Mixtec documentation for land issues, but sparse for market activity, perhaps because indigenous cabildos did not regulate commerce or mediate economic disputes except for land.  Long-distance trade existed in the prehispanic era and continued in indigenous hands in the early colonial.  In the second half of the colonial period, there were bilingual Mixtec merchants, dealing in both Spanish and indigenous goods, who operated regionally. However, in the Mixteca “by the eighteenth century, commerce was dominated by Spaniards in all but the most local venues of exchange, involving the sale of agricultural commodities and indigenous crafts or the resale of imported goods.”.

Despite the development of a local exchange economy, a number of Spaniards with economic interests in Oaxaca, including “[s]ome of the Mixteca priests, merchants, and landowners maintained permanent residence in Puebla, and labor for the obrajes (textile workshops) of the city of Puebla in the sixteenth and seventeenth centuries was sometimes recruited from peasant villages in the Mixteca." There is evidence of community litigation against Mixtec caciques who leased land to Spaniards and the growth of individually contracted wage labor. Mixtec documentation from the late eighteenth century indicates that "most caciques were simply well-to-do investors in Spanish-style enterprises"; some married non-Indians; and in the late colonial era had little claim to hereditary authority.

Geography

The Mixtec area, both historically and currently, corresponds roughly to the western half of the state of Oaxaca, with some Mixtec communities extending into the neighboring state of Puebla to the north-west and also the state of Guerrero. The Mixtec people and their homelands are often subdivided into three geographic areas: The Mixteca Alta or Highland Mixtec living in the mountains in, around, and to the west of the Valley of Oaxaca; the Mixteca Baja or Lowland Mixtec living to the north and west of these highlands, and the Mixteca de la Costa or Coastal Mixtec living in the southern plains and the coast of the Pacific Ocean. For most of Mixtec history, the Mixteca Alta was the dominant political force, with the capitals of the Mixtec nation located in the central highlands. The valley of Oaxaca itself was often a disputed border region, sometimes dominated by the Mixtec and sometimes by their neighbors to the east, the Zapotec.

An ancient Coixtlahuaca Basin cave site known as the Colossal Natural Bridge is an important sacred place for the Mixtec.

Mixtec rulers

In Mixteca Costa

Acatepec, Yucu Yoo

 1090-1097: Lady 6 Monkey War Quexquemitl (usurper, deposed),
 Sub-rulers Lord 3 Aligator and Lord 1 Movement
 1097-1115: Lord 8 Deer Jaguar Claw (usurper)

Tututepec, Yucu Dzaa

 ?: Nizainzo Huidzo
 c.357: Mzatzin
 1084-1097: Lord 8 Deer Jaguar Claw (usurper)
 to Tilantongo

Zacatepec, Yucu Chatuta

 1120-?: Lord 11 Jaguar Tlaloc Fire Wall

In Mixteca Alta

Achiutla, Ñuu Ndecu

Suchixtlán/Huachino dynasty
 ?: Lord 11 Flower Cloud Xicolli, with Lady 13 Wind Cloud Hair (siblings and spouses, children of Lord 4 Wind, King of Nuu Yuchi)
 ?: Lord 10 Aligator Digging Stick (father-in-law of Lord 2 Wind, King of Tlaxiaco)
 ?: Lord 8 Wind Smoked Claw (brother-in-law of Lord 12 Deer, King of Tlaxiaco)
 ?: Lord 7 Movement Blood Shedding Rain (son-in-law of 11 Wind, King of Tlaxiaco)
 ?: Lord 9 Wind Sun Fire Serpent
 ?: Lord 10 Aligator Jaguar with Claws like Flints (son of the previous)

Water Rubber Ball (Chacahua? Manialtepec?)

 ?: Lord 9 Serpent (deposed)
 ?-1115: Lord 8 Deer Jaguar Claw (usurper)

Andua

 ?: Lord 3 Monkey Mexican Jaguar

Bulto de Xipe/Huachino

 ?: Lord 10 Movement
 ?: Lord 12 Lizard
 ?-1101: Lord 11 Wind Blood Jaguar (son of the previous)
 To Tilantongo (1101-1115) and Nuu Yuchi (1115-1164)
 ?: Lord 6 Vulture Jaguar with Knife (son of Lord 9 Rain of Tlaxiaco)

Chalcatongo, Nuu Ndaya

 ?: Lord 8 Aligator Bloody Coyote
 ?: Lord 3 Dog (son-in-law of Lord 8 Alligator, in the settlement of Santa Catarina Yuxia, Yuu Usa)
 ?: Lord 13 Jaguar War Beard (descendant)

Cholula

 ?: Lord 1 Lizard Serpent-Decorated Shield, with Lady 11 Serpent Jewel Mouth (wife)
 c.1096: Lord 4 Jaguar Night Face

Jaltepec, Añute

 ?: Lord 10 Reed Eagle
 ?: Lord 3 Rain (son of the previous)

Suchixtlán dynasty
 ?-1027: Lord 8 Wind Twenty Jaguars
 ?: Lord 13 Grass (son of Lord 8 Wind, in the settlement of  Arrow-Red Liquid )
 1027-1090: Lady 9 Wind Stone Quexquemitl (daughter of Lord 8 Wind), with Lord 10 Eagle Stone Jaguar (son of Lord 10 Flower, King of Tilantongo)
 1090-1101: Lady 6 Monkey War Quexquemitl (daughter of the previous)
 1101-?: Lord 1 Alligator Field Eagle (son of the previous)
 ?: Lord 5 Lizard (son of the previous)
 ?: Lord 3 Reed (son of the previous)
 ?: Lord 1 Rain (son of the previous)
 ?: Lord 9 Lizard Flames (descendant)
 ?: Lord 2 Jaguar (son of the previous)
 ?: Lord 5 Water Jaguar of Tlaxiaco (son of the previous)
 ?: Lord 10 Monkey Rain Falling from Heaven (son of the previous)
 ?: Lord 10 Rain Sun Rain
 ?: Lord 13 Grass Fire Serpent

Juquila, Nuu Sitoho

 ?: Lord 1 Death Sun Serpent, with Lady 11 Serpent Flower Quetzal Feathers (wife)

"Monkey"

 ?: Lord 7 Grass Bloody Jaguar

Mitlatongo, Dzandaya

 ?: Lord 1 Monkey

Flower Mountain, Yucu Ita

 ?: Lord 11 Jaguar

Broken Mountain

 ?: Lady 1 Death

Place of Flints/Pedernales, Nuu Yuchi

Suchixtlán/Huachino dynasty
 1115-1164: Lord 4 Wind Fire Serpent  (son of Lady 6 Monkey, Queen of Jaltepec)
 1164-?: Lady 13 Flower Precious Jewel (daughter of the previous
 ?: Lord 7 Eagle Flames (son of the previous)
 ?: Lord 4 Jaguar War Jaguar (brother of the previous)
 ?: Lord 1 Eagle (son of the previous)
 ?: Lord 7 Reed (son of the previous)
 Annexed to Teozacoalco

Quetzal

 ?: Lord 4 Stone Face with Quetzal Feathers

Río de la Serpiente

 ?: Lord 3 Eagle

San Pedro Cántaros, Nuu Naha

Teozacoalco dynasty
 ?: Lord 1 House Jaguar Sky Assassin (son of Lord 8 Rabbit, King of Teozacoalco)
 ?: Lord 6 Death Sun Rain (descendant, brother-in-law of Lord 6 Deer, King of Teozacoalco)
 ?: Lord 3 Dog (son of the previous)
 ?: Lord 3 Monkey (grandson of the previous)

Place of the Drum (Soyaltepec) (?)

 ?: Lord 4 Jaguar Serpent War Snare

Suchixtlán, Chiyo Yuhu

 ?: Lord 8 Wind Stone Eagle/Twenty Eagles (also in Jaltepec)

Teozacoalco dynasty
 ?: Lord 13 Eagle Bloody Jaguar (husband of Lady 12 Flower, Queen of Tilantongo)
 ?: Lord 6 Deer Sacred Rain (brother-in-law of the previous; also king in Teozacoalco)
 ?: Lord 4 Death War Venus (son of the previous)
 ?: Lord 8 Monkey (nephew of the former; son of Lord 4 Flower, King of Teozacoalco)

Teita
 ?: Lord 10 Rabbit Heart
 ?: Lord 13 Jaguar War Eagle

Teozacoalco, Chiyo Cahnu

Teozacoalco dynasty
 ?: Lord 4 Dog Coyote Hunter (born c.1110; son of Lord 8 Deer of Tilantongo; independence from Tilantongo)
 ?: Lord 13 Dog Venus Eagle (son of the previous)
 ?: Lord 7 Water Red Eagle (son of the previous)
 ?: Lord 13 Eagle Sacred Rain (son of the previous)
 ?: Lord 8 Rabbit Fire of Tlaxiaco (born in 1189; son of the previous)
 ?: Lord 12 House Flying Fire Serpent in the Sky, with Lady 11 Alligator Quetzal Jewel (siblings and spouses, children of Lord 8 Rabbit)
 ?-1321/c.1342: Lord 9 Movement Precious Water, with Lady 2 Jaguar Jade Spiderweb (siblings and spouses, children of the previous)

Zaachila/Xipe dynasty
 1321/1346-?: Lord 2 Dog Rope and Knives (son of Lady 4 Rabbit, sister of the previous)
 ?: Lord 9 House Mexican Jaguar (son of the previous)
 ?: Lord 2 Water Fire Serpent (son of the previous, also in Tilantongo)
 ?: Lord 5 Rain Eagle that comes down from Heaven (son of the previous, also in Tilantongo)

Here there was an exchange of lines: Lord 5 Rain's sons inherited Tlaxiaco; the inheritors of Teozacoalco were the children of Lady 12 Flower (Lord 5 Rain's sister).

Suchixtlán dynasty
 ?: Lord 6 Deer Sacred Rain (born in 1393; son of Lady 12 Flower, sister of the previous)
 ?: Lord 4 Flower Pheasant (born in 1409; son of the previous)
 ?: Lord 10 Rain Sun Rain (born in 1438; son of the previous)
 ?: Lord 4 Deer Eagle of Tlaxiaco (born in 1476; son of the previous)

Tilantongo, Ñuu Tnoo

1st dynasty of Tilantongo
 ?: Lord 10 House Jaguar
 ?: Lord 3 Eagle Eagle of the Serpent Place 
 ?: Lord 9 Wind Stone Skull
 ?: Lord 10 Flower (I) Burnt-Eyed Jaguar
 ?: Lord 10 Flower (II) Tail Arc (brother-in-law of 10 Flower (I); in the settlement of  Dark Speckled Mountain )
 ?: Lord 13 Death (son-in-law of 10 Flower; in the settlement of  Head ; he would also become father-in-law of Lord 8 Deer)
 ?: Lord 10 Reed (I) Precious Jaguar (son-in-law of 10 Flower (I); in the settlement of  Tataltepec (Yucu Tatnu))
 ?: Lord 10 Reed (II) (son-in-law of 10 Flower (I); in the settlement of Topiltepec, Yucu Quesi/Nuu Ñañu )
 ?-c.1080: Lord 12 Lizard Arrow Feet (son of Lord 10 Flower (I))
 c.1080-?: Lord 5 Movement (son of the previous)
 ?-1096: Lord 2 Rain Twenty Jaguars (son of the previous)
 Lady 4 Rabbit Precious Quetzal (sister of Lord 12 Lizard) was the probable heiress, as, before usurping the throne, Lord 8 Deer had bowed to her)

2nd dynasty of Tilantongo
 1097-1115: Lord 8 Deer Jaguar Claw (usurper; after his death influence passed to Pedernales', but succession continues)
 ?: Lord 1 Deer Coanacoch (father-in-law of Lord 8 Deer, in the settlement of Cuyotepeji)
 1115-?: Lord 6 House Jaguar Falling from Heaven (son of the previous)
 ?: Lord 5 Water Stone Jaguar Heaven (son of the previous)
 ?: Lord 8 Reed Pheasant, with Lady 5 Rabbit Jewel (siblings and spouses, children of the previous)
 ?-1206: 2 Movement Serpent with Markings (son of the previous)
 Lord 1 Lizard Bloody Jaguar (son of the previous, heir apparent)
 1206-?: Lord 12 Reed Coyote Sun, with Lady 3 Jaguar Precious Butterfly Sun (siblings and spouses, children of Lord 1 Lizard)
 ?: Lord 5 Rain Sun Movement (son of the previous)
 ?: Lord 7 Movement Bloody Jaguar (father-in-law of Lord 5 Rain, in the settlement of  Puma )
 ?: Lord 13 Wind Fire Serpent (son of Lord 5 Rain)
 ?: Lord 9 Serpent Jaguar that Lightens the War (son of the previous)
 ?-1341: Lord 4 Water Bloody Eagle (son of the previous)

Teozacoalco dynasty
 1341-?: Lady 6 Water Quetzal Flower War Jewel (widow of the previous)
 ?: Lord 2 Water Fire Serpent (brother of the previous, also in Teozacoalco)
 ?: Lord 5 Rain Eagle that comes down from Heaven (son of the previous, also in Teozacoalco)
 ?: Lady 12 Flower Broken Mountain Butterfly (daughter of the previous), with Lord 13 Eagle Bloody Jaguar (of Suchixtlán; husband)
 To Teozacoalco

Tlaxiaco, Ndisi Nuu

1st dynasty of Tlaxiaco
 ?: Lord 8 Jaguar Bloody Coyote
 ?: Lord 4 Grass Sun Face(son of the previous)
 ?: Lord 2 Wind Bloody Rain (son of the previous)
 ?: Lord 2 Movement Fire Serpent in Flames (uncle of the previous; brother of Lord 4 Grass)
 ?: Lord 3 Serpent Flame Rain (son of the previous)
 ?: Lord 1 Deer Eagle (son of the previous)
 ?-1305: Lord 12 Rain Bloody Jaguar (son of the previous)
 1305-?: Lady 8 Serpent Sun Spiderweb (daughter of the previous), with Lord 3 Dog Venus Sun (great-grandson of Lord 1 Movement, brother of Lord 2 Wind)
 ?: Lord 12 Deer Serpent that Lightens the War (son of the previous)
 ?: Lord 6 Death (son of the previous)
 ?: Lord 4 Movement (son of the previous)
 ?: Lady 11 Rabbit Jewel of the Rising Sun (niece of 12 Deer; daughter of Lord 12 Deer's sister Lady 10 Dog)

2nd dynasty of Tlaxiaco
 ?: Lord 10 Rabbit Jaguar of Tlaxiaco (husband and co-ruler of the previous)
 ?: Lord 9 Rain Bloody Jaguar (son of the previous)
 ?: Lord 11 Wind Smoked Claw (son of the previous)
 ?: Lord 1 Dog (brother-in-law of Lord 11 Wind, in the settlement of  Feline Mountain )
 ?: Lord 1 Monkey Sun Rain (son of Lord 11 Wind)
 ?: Lord 3 Reed Smoked Eye (son of Lord 1 Monkey, in the settlement of Cuilapán)
 ?: Lord 13 Eagle Eagle of Tlaxiaco (son of Lord 1 Monkey)

Teozacoalco dynasty
 ?: Lady 8 Deer Quetzal Spiderweb (daughter of Lady 5 Flower, daughter of the previous, and Lord 5 Rain, King of Teozacoalco)
 ?: Lord 3 Serpent Venus Sun (brother of the previous)
 ?-1511: Lord 8 Grass Sun Rain (Malinaltzin) (brother of the previous)

Totomihuacan

 ?: Lord 5 Eagle

Tula (Toltec)

 ?: Lord 4 Jaguar

Deep Valley

 ?: Lord 12 Dog Eagle, with Lady 5 Lizard Pulque-Zacate Vase (wife)

Yanhuitlán

 c.1320: Lord 6 Water Multicolored Feathers
 c.1500?: Lady 1 Flower Jaguar Quexquemitl, with Lord 8 Death Fire Serpent (husband; son of Lord 10 Rain, King of Teozacualco)

Zaachila, Nuhu Tocuisi (Zapotec)

Xipe dynasty
 ?: Lord 9 Serpent
 ?-1328: Lord 5 Flower Xipe (son of the previous)
 1328-1361: Lord 3 Alligator, Ozomatli (second son of the previous)
 1361-1386: Lord 11 Water Stone Rain, Huijatoo (son of the previous)
 1386-1415: Lord 6 Water, Zaachila I (son of the previous)
 1415-1454: Lord 3 Reed Smoked Eye, Zaachila II (son of the previous)
 1454-1487: Lord 5 Reed Twenty Jaguars, Zaachila III (cousin of the previous; son of Lady 3 Alligator, daughter of King 11 Water)
 1487-1502: Lord 8 Deer Fire Serpent, Cosijoeza (nephew of the previous; son of Lord 5 Rain, King of Teozacoalco)
 1502-1523: Cosijopii I, with Pinopija (until c.1520) (children of the previous)
 1502-1518: Xilabela, regent

In Mixteca Baja

Acatlan

 ?: Lord 1 Rain
 ?: Lord 9 Reed (son of the previous)
 ?: Lord 6 Deer (son of the previous)
 ?: Lord 4 Dog (son of the previous)
 ?: Lord 8 Flint (son of the previous)
 ?: Lord 8 Alligator (son of the previous)
 ?: Lord 7 Monkey (son of the previous)
 ?: Lord 8 Movement (son of the previous)
 ?: Lord 9 Flint (son of the previous)
 ?: Lord 6 Water (son of the previous)
 ?: Lord 4 Eagle (son of the previous)
 ?: Lord 10 Reed (son of the previous)
 ?: Lord 4 Flower (son of the previous)
 ?: Lord 4 House (son of the previous)
 ?-1519/20: Unknown (son of the previous)
 To the Spanish

Chila

 ?: Lord 10 Flint
 ?: Lord 4 Deer (son of the previous)
 ?: Lord 1 Eagle (son of the previous)
 ?: Lord 13 Dog (son of the previous)
 ?: Lord 13 Reed (son of the previous)
 ?: Lord 2 Monkey (son of the previous)
 ?: Lord 10 Monkey (son of the previous)
 ?: Lord 10 Movement (son of the previous)
 ?: Lord 3 House (son of the previous)
 ?: Lord 8 Wind (son of the previous)
 ?: Lord 6 Rabbit (son of the previous)
 ?: Lord 13 Death (son of the previous)
 ?: Lord 1 House (son of the previous)
 ?: Lord 5 Monkey (son of the previous)
 ?-1519/20: Lord 4 Dog (son of the previous)
 To the Spanish

Language, codices, and artwork

The Mixtecan languages (in their many variants) were estimated to be spoken by about 300,000 people at the end of the 20th century, although the majority of Mixtec speakers also had at least a working knowledge of the Spanish language. Some Mixtecan languages are called by names other than Mixtec, particularly Cuicatec (Cuicateco), and Triqui (or Trique).

The Mixtec are well known in the anthropological world for their Codices or phonetic pictures in which they wrote their history and genealogies in deerskin in the "fold-book" form. The best-known story of the Mixtec Codices is that of Lord Eight Deer, named after the day in which he was born, whose personal name is Jaguar Claw, and whose epic history is related in several codices, including the Codex Bodley and Codex Zouche-Nuttall. He successfully conquered and united most of the Mixteca region.

They were also known for their exceptional mastery of jewelry and mosaic, among which gold and turquoise figure prominently. Products by Mixtec goldsmiths formed an important part of the tribute the Mixtecs paid to the Aztecs during parts of their history. Turquoise mosaic masks also played an important role in both political and religious functions. These masks were used as gifts to form political alliances, in ceremonies during which the wearer of the mask impersonated a god, and were fixed to funerary bundles that were seen as oracles.

References

Further reading

External links

 
Pre-Columbian cultures of Mexico
Indigenous peoples in Mexico
Mesoamerican cultures
Mesoamerican people
Archaeological cultures of North America